Jalopy Go Far is the second release from the pop rock band, Zolof the Rock & Roll Destroyer. Several tracks appeared on the self-titled debut, but were re-recorded for this release. Additionally, "Plays Pretty for Baby" was re-recorded with different lyrics as "Super OK."

Track listing
 Mean Old Coot
 Super OK
 Moment
 The Hot Situation
 Wonderful Awkward
 How Bout It
 I Owe You
 Don't Mope
 Scream and Run
 Running Starts Will Only Get You Faster to the Place That Will Make You Say Ouch

2003 albums
Zolof the Rock & Roll Destroyer albums